The Parnall Elf is a British two seat light touring aircraft of the 1920s. Built by George Parnall & Co. the Elf was the last aircraft designed by Harold Bolas before he left the company to go to the United States.

Design and development
The Parnall Elf was designed by Harold Bolas, chief designer of the reformed George Parnall & Co. The type made its public debut at Olympia in July 1929. The Elf was a biplane of wood and fabric construction with staggered wings set well forward on the fuselage as a feature to assist crew escape in an emergency. The wings were unusually braced with 'vee' interplane struts which dispensed with any flying wires and could be folded for ease of hangarage. The main fuel tank was fitted in the fuselage, while a pump raised the fuel to a small tank in the wing centre section where it was then fed to the engine by gravity. An Elf placed fifth in the 1930 King's Cup Air Race out of a field of 88 entrants. The purchase price of the aircraft at this time was between £875 and £890.

Survivors
 Parnall Elf, G-AAIN, is maintained and operated by the Shuttleworth Collection in Bedfordshire, England and may be flown regularly throughout the summer months. 'G-AAIN' flew at the "At The Movies" Drive-In airshow on 2nd August 2020, hosted by the Shuttleworth Collection

Specifications (Elf Mk.II)

See also

References

Bibliography

 Guttery, T.E. The Shuttleworth Collection. London: Wm. Carling & Co, 1969. SBN 901319-01-5
 Ogilvy, David. Shuttleworth – The Historic Aeroplanes. Shrewsbury, England: Airlife Publishing Ltd., 1989

External links

Parnall Elf – British Aircraft Directory
Elf in Flight, 4 April 1930

1920s British civil utility aircraft
1920s British sport aircraft
Single-engined tractor aircraft
Biplanes
Elf
Aircraft first flown in 1929